Franco-Canadian may refer to:

 A collaboration between the France and Canada, similar to the term Franco-Canadian
 A shorthand form for French Canadian